Campylomormyrus rhynchophorus is one of fourteen species of elephantfish in the genus Campylomormyrus. This species is listed as Least Concern by the IUCN. Campylomormyrus rhynchophorus reaches a maximum length of 22 cm.

Distribution 
This fish is distributed throughout the Congo River basin in the countries of Cameroon, the Democratic Republic of the Congo and Angola .

References

Further reading 
 

Weakly electric fish
Mormyridae
Fish described in 1898